Miroslav Nedvěd is a former Czechoslovak slalom canoeist who competed in the 1970s. He won two medals at the 1977 ICF Canoe Slalom World Championships in Spittal with a gold in the C-2 team event and a silver in the C-2 event.

References

Czech male canoeists
Czechoslovak male canoeists
Living people
Year of birth missing (living people)
Medalists at the ICF Canoe Slalom World Championships